was a senior officer in the Imperial Japanese Navy during World War II. Kato was the senior officer of the Imperial Japanese Navy forces on the Bonis Peninsula and Buka Island during the latter stages of World War II.

Lieutenant Kawanishi Shotaro was appointed by Captain Kato as the envoy to meet Australian officers on 14 September 1945 off Soraken Peninsula, to discuss the surrender of the Imperial Japanese Navy forces on the Bonis Peninsula and Buka Island. Kato was convicted of war crimes and was executed at Rabaul in 1946.

Notes
Citations

1897 births
1946 deaths
20th-century executions by Australia
Imperial Japanese Navy officers
Japanese people executed for war crimes

Japanese people executed abroad
People executed by Australia by hanging